Opinion polling has been commissioned throughout the duration of the 49th New Zealand Parliament and in the leadup to the 2011 election by various organisations. The main four are Television New Zealand, TV3, The New Zealand Herald and Roy Morgan Research. The sample size, margin of error and confidence interval of each poll varies by organisation and date.

Party vote and key events
Refusals are generally excluded from the party vote percentages, while question wording and the treatment of "don't know" responses and those not intending to vote may vary between survey firms.

Graphical summary

The first graph below shows trend lines averaged across all polls for parties that have consistently polled on average above the 5.0% threshold. The second graph shows the parties polling over 1% which do not consistently poll above the 5.0% threshold.

Individual polls

Preferred Prime Minister

Individual polls

Other polls

Epsom electorate vote

Voting method referendum

Concern over validity
A new polling company, Horizon, has challenged some of the existing polls' validity as they exclude undecided voters and those who chose not to vote. Horizon claim that this may be up to 30% in some polls. However, Horizon's own polling methods have been criticised for their use of a self-selected internet panel.
At the 2008 election only the Green Party gained a proportion of the party vote outside (below) what poll trends would suggest.

See also
Opinion polling for the 2008 New Zealand general election
Opinion polling for the 2014 New Zealand general election
Opinion polling for the next New Zealand general election
Politics of New Zealand

Notes

References

2011
2011 New Zealand general election
New Zealand